The Keith 'Bluey' Truscott Trophy is an Australian rules football award presented annually to the player(s) adjudged the best and fairest at the Melbourne Football Club throughout the Victorian Football League/Australian Football League (VFL/AFL) season. The Melbourne Football Club was established in 1858 and was a foundation member of the Victorian Football Association, playing in the league from 1877 to 1896. After the formation of the Victorian Football League in 1896, Melbourne joined the league as a foundation club the next year and has competed in the league ever since. The inaugural Melbourne best and fairest winner was Allan La Fontaine in 1935, and he retained it the following season. The award was known as the Melbourne best and fairest until it was renamed in 1943 in honour of Keith 'Bluey' Truscott, a former dual premiership player and World War II fighter ace killed in service in 1943.

Allan La Fontaine and Jim Stynes have both won the award on four occasions in 1935, 1936, 1941 and 1942, and 1991, 1995, 1996 and 1997 respectively; the most for any recipient of the award. Jim Stynes and Nathan Jones are the only two players to have won the award in three consecutive seasons; in the 1995–1997 seasons and 2012–2014 seasons respectively. Two players have won the Keith 'Bluey' Truscott Trophy in the same season as winning the Brownlow Medal, which is awarded to the fairest and best player in the VFL/AFL, Jim Stynes in 1991 and Shane Woewodin in 2000. The voting system as of the 2016 AFL season, consists of four members of the match committee giving each player a ranking out of ten after each game. Players can receive a maximum of 40 votes for a game.

Recipients

Multiple winners

Footnotes

 Records indicating the runners up are unavailable from 1935–1937, 1939–1943 and 1946–1948.
 Records indicating the votes the winner and runner up received are unavailable from 1935–1954 and 1957–1975.

References
General

Specific

External links
Best and Fairest winners at Demonwiki

Australian Football League awards
Melbourne Football Club
Awards established in 1935